Vyshka  may refer to:
Colloquial name of the National Research University – Higher School of Economics
Vyshka, Russia, several rural localities in Russia
Vyshka, Ukraine, a village in Velykyi Bereznyi Raion, Ukraine
Vyshka (TV series), a Ukrainian TV series, variant of Celebrity Splash!